Polebridge is an unincorporated community in Flathead County, Montana, United States,  northwest of Columbia Falls in the northwestern part of the state. This community was named in 1920 for the log bridge that formerly connected the "inner" North Fork Road in Glacier National Park to the "outer" North Fork Road which leads to Montana Secondary Highway 486, over the North Fork Flathead River. Polebridge lies near the Canada–United States border.

The W.L. Adair General Mercantile Historic District is a National Register of Historic Places-listed historic district in Polebridge. It contains the Polebridge Mercantile, which has been in operation since 1914.  The store is open from May through October.

Residents do not have electricity or any form of communication other than mail or media other than newspapers. Candles and whale oil lamps are used for lighting at night. From May through October, the population is just under 100, but during the colder months it falls to the single digits because there are no ways to warm up unless one has a woodstove or coal stove.

Demographics

See also
 Glacier View Dam, proposed in the 1940s, which would have inundated Polebridge

References

Unincorporated communities in Montana
Unincorporated communities in Flathead County, Montana